Harakat al-Shabaab al-Mujahideen, more commonly known as al-Shabaab, (also referring to itself as the Islamic Emirate of Somalia since 2011,) is a Salafi-jihadist military and political organisation based in Somalia and active elsewhere in East Africa. It is actively involved in the ongoing Somali Civil War and incorporates elements of Somali nationalism into its Islamist cause. Allegiant to the militant pan-Islamist organization al-Qaeda since 2012, it has also been suspected of forging ties with al-Qaeda in the Islamic Maghreb, and al-Qaeda in the Arabian Peninsula.

Formed in the mid-2000s as part of the Islamic Courts Union, al-Shabaab came to prominence during the 2006–2009 Somalia War, during which it presented itself as a vehicle for the waging of armed resistance against the Ethiopian occupation and Western imperialism. In subsequent years, it gained popular support from Somalis and became a dominant force in south and central Somalia, defending large swathes of territory by fighting against the African Union Mission to Somalia and the Federal Government of Somalia, as well as the latter's transitional predecessor. The group has also frequently clashed with the Somali Sufi militia Ahlu Sunna Waljama'a as well as with the Islamic State in Somalia. Al-Shabaab gained international prominence due to its recruitment of foreign fighters, including fighters who are from Western countries. Countries which include the United States, the United Kingdom, and the United Arab Emirates, have all designated it as a terrorist organization, and the United States has militarily intervened in order to fight against the group.

Between 2011 and 2013, a coalition which mostly consisted of East African forces, led by the Somali government, wrested a significant amount of territory from al-Shabaab, including the capital city, Mogadishu. During the same period, the group was plagued by internal conflicts over its leadership and ideological direction, which intensified when, in February 2012, al-Shabaab's leadership pledged allegiance to al-Qaeda. It suffered further military losses in 2014, as a result of Operation Indian Ocean, and the killing of its emir, Ahmed Abdi Godane, in an American drone strike, as well as the killing of other leaders. For several years thereafter, al-Shabaab retreated from the major cities, but it remained influential in many rural areas, and it prioritized guerrilla and terror attacks over territorial acquisitions. It is responsible for many high-fatality attacks, including the 2013 Westgate shopping mall attack in Nairobi, Kenya, the October 2017 Mogadishu bombings, the December 2019 Mogadishu bombing, and the October 2022 Mogadishu bombings. In addition to being active in Somalia, it is also active in other East African countries, especially in Kenya, and occasionally also in Ethiopia. Attendant to its recent resurgence, it was estimated to have increased its combat strength to between 7,000 and 12,000 fighters in February 2022.

Name
Al-Shabaab is also known as Ash-Shabaab, Hizb al-Shabaab ("Party of the Youth") and as the Popular Resistance Movement in the Land of the Two Migrations (PRM). The term al-Shabaab means "the youth" in Arabic.

Organisation and structure

Origins 
Although it is unclear when al-Shabaab was formed, it is understood to have originated as a wing of the Islamic Courts Union, an umbrella group which provided de facto governance in much of Somalia until the country was invaded by Ethiopia in December 2006. In 2007–8, al-Shabaab established itself as an independent actor, gaining prominence as a vehicle of armed resistance to Ethiopian occupation in the War in Somalia. Many of its early leaders and members previously belonged not only to the Islamic Courts Union but also to the older al-Ittihad al-Islamiya, a group founded on the tenets of Salafism and opposition to clannism. Many early al-Shabaab leaders had also been trained as mujahideen in Afghanistan and Syria.

Ideology 
According to the International Crisis Group, Salafism has been the core unifying principle of al-Shabaab, although this principle is not interpreted uniformly by the group's members and leaders. In particular, al-Shabaab officially and generally advocates a form of Salafi jihadism with transnational aims, linking Somali nationalist and local grievances to the plight of Muslims worldwide. Through this lens, incursions into Somalia by Ethiopia – and later by Kenya, the United States, and others – are viewed as continuous with non-Muslim acts of aggression in other Muslim-majority countries. However, this globalist framework is not universal within the group, an ideological fault-line which has sometimes fostered factionalism and internal conflict. Much of al-Shabaab's Somali support base is fiercely nationalist, and sees as its primary goal the establishment of a stable Islamic state inside Somalia, or, more ambitiously, inside so-called Greater Somalia, uniting the ethnic Somali populations of Ethiopia, Kenya, and Djibouti. Other domestic supporters are concerned primarily with clan-related and local objectives, and are therefore prone to infighting and shifting alliances.

However, these ideological differences can accommodate broad opposition within the group to common adversaries – notably opposition to external intervention in Somalia, often publicly expressed in quasi-Qutbist terms; and opposition to the internationally recognised Somali government, which, lacking a basis in religious (Sharia) law, is seen to lack legitimacy. Al-Shabaab hardliners broadly adhere to a Takfiri interpretation of the principle of al-wala' wal-bara', insofar as it prescribes dissociation from non-Muslims and those perceived as apostates.

A major component of Al-Shabaab's ideology is Somali religious nationalism which is incorporated into its Pan-Islamist cause. Patriotic themes warning Somalis of the plots from international NGOs, "Christian Crusaders" (United States, Ethiopia, AMISOM) and their collaborators are a regular feature of the movement's propaganda. During the Ethiopian invasion of Somalia, Al-Shabab positioned itself as a staunch nationalist militia under the Islamic Muqawwama (resistance coalition) of the Islamic Courts Union, taking the most hardline stance against the invading "Christian crusaders". After the collapse of the ICU in 2007, Al-Shabaab launched its own independent insurgency, gaining popular support from Somalis for defending the country from American imperialism and foreign occupation. Al-Qaeda began enhancing its co-operation and support to Al-Shabab during this period, which enabled the movement to establish itself as the strongest military power in Southern Somalia. Al-Shabab regards Somalia's Federal Government as an illegitmitate "apostate" entity backed by foreign invaders.

The group has persecuted members of Somalia's small Christian minority; accusing them of aiding the agenda of foreign "Crusaders" to "convert Somalis to Christianity". It has desecrated a Sufi mosque and graves on the basis that over-embellishing them into shrines is incompatible with Sharia, and has clashed with the pro-AMISOM Sufi militias of Ahlu Sunna Waljama'a. In addition, its statements have expressed anti-Zionist sentiments, and the group claimed that its 2019 DusitD2 complex attack was retaliation against the declaration of Jerusalem as the capital of Israel.

Size and structure 
In 2017, observers estimated that al-Shabaab comprised between 7,000 and 9,000 fighters. In 2018, the Council of Foreign Relations and United States military revised this figure downwards, estimating 3,000 to 6,000 and 4,000 to 6,000 respectively. Reflecting an apparent al-Shabaab resurgence, the United States Africa Command estimated 5,000 to 10,000 fighters two years later, in 2020. Most recently, an expert report submitted to the United Nations (UN) Security Council in early February 2022 estimated that al-Shabaab's fighting force had grown to between 7,000 and 12,000 fighters. The group is led by a shura council of senior leaders, appointed and assigned portfolios by the emir, and operates several internal security organs, including an intelligence agency, Amniyat, and a police force, Jeysh Al-Hisbah.

Membership 
Especially in its early years, al-Shabaab was sometimes characterised by Somali opponents as dominated by the Hawiye clan, which is one of the largest clans in Somalia. Hawiye remain influential in the group, and, according to a 2018 analysis by the Somali Hiraal Institute, five of the ten members of the executive shura council were Hawiye, as were about 94 of the top 220 officials. However, al-Shabaab is attached to an ethos of anti-clannism, and has therefore tried to appeal to minority groups and to ensure ethnic and clan diversity among its leadership. It incorporates a relatively large contingent of foreign fighters . Rank-and-file members, though sometimes recruited by force, are also attracted by the regular pay that al-Shabaab offers and by its political propaganda. In the past, many young al-Shabaab recruits were drawn from marginalised southern clans, such as the Jareer. Many are children.

In February 2012, Fu'ad Qalaf Shongole, an al-Shabaab officer with responsibility for "awareness raising", encouraged a Somali gathering to send their unmarried daughters to fight jihad with al-Shabaab, which until then had used only male fighters. However, according to International Crisis Group, women rarely participate directly in military decision-making or operations, though they do play important roles in recruitment, intelligence, and explosives smuggling.

History

2006–09: Ethiopian incursion 

Al-Shabaab rose to prominence as a relatively well-organised militia, garnering popular support from Somalis sympathetic to their opposition to the Ethiopian invasion: though the invasion had fractured the Islamic Courts Union, it galvanised nationalism on which al-Shabaab capitalised, especially for recruitment purposes. In the military arena, al-Shabaab suffered key losses during offensives by the African Union Mission to Somalia (AMISOM), which was established in 2007, but during this phase "put down the roots of an enduring insurgency", establishing networks and territorial bases concentrated in rural south-central Somalia.

2009–10: Dominance in the south 
Having made important territorial gains from mid-2008, al-Shabaab increasingly focused its attention on opposition to the Somali Transitional Federal Government, as the Ethiopian-led war segued into the next phase of the protracted Somali Civil War. By 2009–10, al-Shabaab controlled most of central and southern Somalia (south of the semi-autonomous region of Puntland), and it had formed administrative structures to govern territories under its control. It had particular success building relationships with local leaders in order to build cross-clan coalitions, combining its principled anti-clannism with a "pragmatic clannism": a willingness to manipulate clan networks and exploit inter-clan politics.

2011–13: Internal and external challenges 
In subsequent years, however, al-Shabaab's strong position was significantly weakened, as – in the context of a famine in the region and, simultaneously, a military offensive against the group – the group experienced territorial and strategic setbacks in the military arena; an internal struggle over the group's direction and leadership; and, in response to both, a wave of high-profile defections.

Territorial losses 
The group's military fortunes turned with the failure of the August 2010 Ramadan offensive – the inauguration of the Battle of Mogadishu – which resulted in heavy al-Shabaab losses. By August 2011, al-Shabaab had announced a "strategic withdrawal" from Mogadishu, although, from outlying districts, it continued to exert influence in the city and to launch deadly guerrilla attacks against AMISOM and the TFG. In October and November 2011, Kenya and Ethiopia – partnering with local militias – launched offensives against al-Shabaab strongholds: Kenya's Operation Linda Nchi on the southern front, while Ethiopia approached from the west. The group lost territory to both armies, notably losing Baidoa to Ethiopia in February 2012 and losing the port city (and revenue hub) of Kismayo to Kenya in October 2012. Military pressures on the group were sustained into 2013.

Drought, al-Qaeda, and internal struggle 
Some al-Shabaab members viewed the 2010 Ramadan offensive as disastrously ill-conceived, and subsequent territorial losses galvanised internal opposition to the leadership of Ahmed Abdi Godane, who was publicly named the group's emir in December 2007. As a severe drought afflicted the region, critics, generally associated with the leadership of Hassan Dahir Aweys and Mukhtar Robow, opposed al-Shabaab's response to the resulting famine, particularly its obstruction of foreign humanitarian aid to populations in its territories . More broadly, they argued that the group's authoritarian style of governance, and use of violence, were causing the group to lose public support. Some suggested that these leadership missteps were the result of Godane's lack of clan roots, which they said led him to undervalue the lives both of civilians and of al-Shabaab fighters.

These criticisms became intertwined with a broader and pre-existing dispute over the increasingly globalist flavour of al-Shabaab's ideology – Godane was among the faction which viewed Somalia as only one battleground of global jihad. Godane's announcement in February 2012 of a merger with al-Qaeda  thus also met opposition. Other senior al-Shabaab members met at a conference in Baidabo, and outlined a policy programme which diverged from Godane's: they rejected Godane's proposal to change the group's name to al-Qaeda in East Africa, and resolved to focus on domestic issues rather than global jihad. They also resolved to establish a national shura of Islamic clerics, independent of al-Qaeda control. Godane's rival Aweys declared  publicly that, "Al-Shabaab and al-Qaeda are merely a small part of the larger Islamic group and al-Qaeda's ideology should not be viewed as the sole, righteous path for Islam."

In 2013, these internal rifts led to internecine violence as Godane effected what was virtually a purge of his critics. Among those killed were Ibrahim al-Afghani and three other senior commanders, executed in June; and Omar Shafik Hammami, killed in September. Journalist Simon Tisdall viewed the September 2013 Westgate shopping mall shooting in Nairobi, Kenya as a reflection of the internal power struggle, with Godane's hardline globalist faction seeking to exert its authority.

Defections 
From mid-to-late 2011, and into 2012, al-Shabaab faced an increasing number of defections. It was not the first such wave of defections: in particular, in late 2009, after the Ethiopian departure from Somalia, several leaders had defected to the Somali government, citing complaints about al-Shabaab's use of suicide attacks and executions; its "false interpretations of Islam"; and its use of extortion and attitude towards foreign humanitarian aid. Such defections were viewed as strategically important to al-Shabaab's adversaries, not only for their propaganda use but because former militants could provide intelligence about al-Shabaab's combat strategy. However, according to AMISOM and the Somali government, the volume of defections in the period around 2012 was unprecedented, and indicated that al-Shabaab's cohesion and authority were deteriorating: in June 2012, the government said that around 500 al-Shabaab militants had already defected to it, and that more were doing so every day. Al-Shabaab brutalities, which alienated local populations, were again cited as central in motivating defections. On September 5 and September 22, 2012, two large contingents of al-Shabaab fighters – around 200 each time – surrendered to the government coalition in Afmadow and Garsale respectively. Another wave of defections and desertions followed Godane's 2013 purges – Aweys, for example, fled the group in mid-2013.

2013–17: Regrouping 
Following its territorial losses, al-Shabaab reverted to the tactics of asymmetric warfare, launching guerrilla attacks on AMISOM and government positions and territories. Southern commander Aweys had announced this new strategy in a media interview shortly after the withdrawal from Mogadishu in August 2011. Al-Shabaab increasingly avoided direct military combat and large battles, in favour of "dictat[ing] the conflict's pace by undertaking smaller ambushes at locations of its own choosing". It also developed a strategy of maintaining a "semi-territorial presence" in key regions and parts of key cities: while it no longer had exclusive and military authority over substantial territory, it retained a sporadic presence, and therefore significant influence, in many places.Nonetheless, by 2016, al-Shabaab was viewed as significantly weakened by the military campaign against it, with earlier losses compounded in 2014–15 by Operation Indian Ocean, a joint endeavour by AMISOM, the Somali government, and the United States. The Somali government claimed in October 2014 that over 700 al-Shabaab militants had surrendered since September, when it had extended an amnesty offer to them. Reports of further senior defections continued into 2015. Moreover, an American drone strike killed Godane on September 1, 2014; he was succeeded as al-Shabaab leader by Ahmad Umar Abu Ubaidah, who took office the same week. Other senior members were killed in armed clashes or by American drone strikes in 2014 and 2015. According to some reports, since Godane's death, the group has placed less weight on global jihad than on local grievances.

2018–2022: Resurgence 
In October 2017, more than 500 people were killed by a suicide truck bombing in Mogadishu. Al-Shabaab did not claim responsibility for the attack but was suspected of involvement. In December 2019, another suicide truck bomb marked the beginning of a series of al-Shabaab attacks on the capital city, which continued into 2022. Al-Shabaab also targeted American military personnel in an attack on a Kenyan base in January 2020, and in July 2022 launched an unusually bold, though short-lived, incursion into Ethiopian territory. By 2020, the group's strategy of semi-territorialism allowed it operate freely in much of rural Somalia, with its primary base in the Jubba River Valley, although air strikes against its leaders continued; and it has recently won military successes against the government. It had also expanded its operations in Puntland, prompting a military offensive by Puntland forces in 2021. As of July 2022, al-Shabaab is generally considered to be "resurgent", a situation partly enabled by a reduction in the number of American air strikes, and possibly motivated by competition with Islamic State in Somalia, which has been conducting its own expansionary campaign.

2022–present: Retaliation 

In August 2022, Somali President Hassan Sheikh Mohamud declared "total war" against Al Shabaab during a televised address after the group carried out a deadly hotel attack in Mogadishu and also announced that the Somalia military had regained territory from al Shabaab in the central Galmudug state and Southwest state. Al By September 2022 Somali and ATMIS offensive operations against al-Shabaab, with U.S. support, would escalate to the highest point in five years. The operation, which is considered a combined Somali-ATMIS offensive, began in August 2022 and, with assistance from U.S. airstrikes, has been focused on disrupting al-Shabaab activity in Somalia's central Hiraan region. Other Al Shabaab-controlled areas in southern Somalia have been targeted by the Somalia military as well. On 20 September 2022, as the military operation progressed, a statement was released by the Somali Ministry of Information which revealed that President Sheikh would not offer any other option than surrender for al-Shabaab members.

Propaganda strategy
Although al-Shabaab has disseminated its propaganda by various media, the bulk of its engagement with Somalis in rural areas is either face-to-face or by radio broadcast. Face-to-face, the group holds seminars on Islamic jurisprudence and community meetings on such matters such as grain and livestock distribution. It operates its own radio station, Radio Andalus, mainly operated using relay stations and other equipment seized from private radio stations, including the BBC. Presenters broadcast in Somali, Arabic, Swahili and English. In April 2010, al-Shabaab banned BBC and Voice of America broadcasts on Somali radio, objecting to what they alleged was Christian propaganda. Also in 2010, and prior to its expulsion from Mogadishu the following year, al-Shabaab launched a television news channel, Al-Kataib News. The group has also been known to conduct military parades in its territories, as a show of force.

Propaganda films 
Al-Shabaab began creating propaganda films early in its campaign against Ethiopian forces, produced by its dedicated media wing, al-Kataib Media Foundation. Since 2009, al-Shabaab's films have become noticeably more "professional", both in their production quality and in their messaging, reportedly with direct support from al-Qaeda's al-Sabab Media Foundation. The early films were distributed primarily, and widely, online, and were primarily used as tools for recruitment, particularly among foreign jihadists. More recent films show al-Shabaab distributing humanitarian aid and participating in other community or religious activities – though others are much more gruesome, displaying the corpses of beheaded members alleged to have been spies. Propaganda films are also occasionally used to attempt to mobilise jihadi activity abroad: in October 2013, one film encouraged British jihadists to follow the example set by Lee Rigby's killers, while a February 2015 film called (without effect) for attacks on shopping malls in Canada, the United Kingdom, and the United States, including the West Edmonton Mall in Alberta, Canada, and the Mall of America in Bloomington, Minnesota.

Internet and social media 
Al-Shabaab was an early adopter among African insurgents of the Internet, which it uses to distribute its propaganda videos and for various other propaganda functions. Especially in its early years, it used online chatrooms and discussion forums, encouraging foreign fighters and even military commanders to post updates and field public questions about the state of the jihad. Particularly prominent was American-born Omar Shafik Hammami, also known as Abu Mansoor Al-Amriki, who for many years kept a video blog about his life in al-Shabaab and who, from 2009, also created and posted raps about jihad. Al-Shabaab also had an official website, which carried official statements and news – including sundry edicts and threats – and religious guidance. Since the site was closed in 2009, it has distributed its press releases and videos using other sympathetic websites, or, more commonly, using social media networks.

Indeed, although al-Shabaab spokesmen occasionally grant interviews to "carefully selected" local and foreign journalists, social media networks have provided an important channel for interaction with the press, as well as for disseminating information and building support. Al-Shabaab has used Facebook, particularly to communicate with the Somali diaspora; and it has made prolific and innovative use of Twitter since late 2011, although its first accounts were active as early as 2009. Online engagement with al-Shabaab surged during Operation Linda Nchi, the Kenyan offensive of 2011–12, when al-Shabaab used Twitter, under the handle @HSMPress, to urge Somalis to take up arms against the Kenyan forces and to portray its own military losses as tactical retreats. In an extreme example of the latter in late 2011, al-Shabaab photos purportedly showed several dozen AMISOM casualties – but, according to an African Union spokesperson, in fact showed al-Shabaab's own casualties dressed in their adversaries' uniforms. What received most attention, however, were tweets al-Shabaab posted mocking the Kenya Defence Forces (KDF) and sparring with Major Emmanuel Chirchir, then the KDF's official spokesman. Responding to Chirchir's claim that Kismayo had been captured by the KDF, al-Shabaab tweeted that the KDF "boys are a grotesque parody of an army! [Al-Shabaab] can outpace ur world-class runners by far. Indeed, they 'Run like a Kenyan'". Showing uncharacteristic levity, al-Shabaab also suggested by Tweet that it meet a UN official for "a caramel macchiato".

Most of al-Shabaab's Tweets are in English, suggesting that they are intended for a foreign audience. In 2011, officials in the United States, where Twitter is based, said they were considering having the account closed, but had legal and free speech concerns. Chirchir himself tweeted that such a move would be counterproductive, as "al-Shabaab needs to be engaged positively, and Twitter is the only avenue." Nonetheless, in January 2013, Twitter suspended al-Shabaab's English-language account. Observers guessed that the suspension was a response to the account having issued death threats against Kenyan hostages and against French spy Denis Allex, followed in the latter case by confirmation that the execution had taken place. A new English-language account, opened in February 2013, was closed in September, for unspecified reasons. This suspension also followed an apparent violation of Twitter's rules: al-Shabaab had recently used the account to claim responsibility for an unsuccessful ambush of a convoy carrying Somali President Hassan Sheikh Mohamud, and to warn that, "next time, you won't be as lucky".

Al-Shabaab relaunched its English-language Twitter account once again on September 11, 2013. Two weeks later, the group gained notoriety for live-tweeting the 2013 Westgate shopping mall attack, "justifying the attack, creating fictional threats, providing news on hostages and mocking the police and military response". The account, which then had 15,000 or more followers, was retweeted several million times before it was shut down by Twitter. And after @HSMPress was deleted, the live updates continued from other, new accounts: over the course of the attack, which lasted several days, at least eight different al-Shabaab-affiliated Twitter accounts were active. Al-Shabaab had opened a new Twitter account by December that year, with an official telling Al Jazeera that, "The aim is to vigorously challenge defamatory reports in the media by presenting an accurate portrayal of the current state of Jihad in Somalia and countering Western, state-sponsored propaganda machines". It has since tweeted, from various accounts, during other attacks; Facebook, too, has had difficulty expeditiously removing graphic al-Shabaab content when it appears on newly created accounts.

Local governance strategy 

In territories it holds, al-Shabaab typically maintains "limited but effective" administrative control over resident populations, providing services – such as dispute resolution through Sharia-based courts – which are sometimes compared favourably to those offered in government-held territories. Al-Shabaab claimed some credit for Somalia's excellent crop yield in early 2010, saying that Somali grain production had flourished due to al-Shabaab's reduction of food imports, and that the policy had redistributed income to poor, rural Somali farmers. However, the group has also allegedly committed widespread human rights abuses against populations in its territories, including through a brutal interpretation and application of Islamic jurisprudence on hudud.

Humanitarian access 
Despite routinely expelling, attacking, and harassing aid workers, al-Shabaab permits some agencies to work in areas under its control. At the height of its territorial control it implemented a system of aid agency regulation, taxation and surveillance. Where agencies are allowed to operate, this is often due to the desire of al-Shabaab to coopt and materially and politically benefit from the provision of aid and services. Senior aid agency representatives often strongly rejected claims that they talked with al-Shabaab, while aid workers working in al-Shabaab-controlled areas often reported they directly negotiated with the group out of necessity. Complaints made against the group include its attacks on aid workers. According to journalist Jon Lee Anderson:The number of people in Somalia who are dependent on international food aid has tripled since 2007, to an estimated 3.6 million. But there is no permanent foreign expatriate presence in southern Somalia, because the Shabaab has declared war on the UN and on Western non-governmental organizations. International relief supplies are flown or shipped into the country and distributed, wherever possible, through local relief workers. Insurgents routinely attack and murder them, too; forty-two have been killed in the past two years alone.In 2009, Godane imposed an al-Shabaab ban on the UN World Food Programme and Western agencies in Somalia. The ban was opposed by other senior members, including Robow and Aweys, but Godane overruled them.

In response to the 2011 Eastern Africa drought, which lasted until early 2012, al-Shabaab announced in July 2011 that it had withdrawn its restrictions on international humanitarian workers. The group also adapted its propaganda strategy to accommodate the changing circumstances. In some cases, group members employed humanitarian aid as a recruitment tool, using relief supplies as bribes and as an incentive to join the militants, whose numbers had decreased due to casualties and defections. Group members dismissed the UN declaration of famine in various regions as grossly exaggerated and banned various organizations from providing aid to those regions. In response, in August 2011, Somali Prime Minister Abdiweli Mohamed Ali announced the establishment of a new 300-man security force, which, assisted by AMISOM, was tasked with protecting aid convoys from al-Shabaab and with securing IDP camps while relief was being distributed. Although fighting disrupted aid delivery in some areas, humanitarian access to al-Shabaab-controlled areas improved, and a scaling up of relief operations in mid-November prompted the UN to downgrade the humanitarian situation in several regions from famine to emergency levels.

Ban on single-use plastic bags 
In July 2018, al-Shabaab announced a complete ban on single-use plastic bags within its territory in a broadcast in which it stated that they "pose a serious threat to the well-being of humans and animals alike", and in the same announcement, it also imposed a complete ban on the logging of several species of rare trees. Some have argued that, whilst these environmentally-conscious advances are welcome, they are overshadowed by the group's terrorist activities, whilst others have mocked the United States and other countries for taking less action on climate change than a terrorist group.

Response to COVID-19 
Al-Shabaab acknowledged the existence of the COVID-19 pandemic and announced the formation of a coronavirus prevention and treatment committee.

Foreign recruitment 
Al-Shabaab is noteworthy in the region for its extensive recruitment of foreign fighters . These foreign recruits include members of the Somali diaspora or ethnic Somalis overseas; citizens of other East African countries; and citizens of countries further afield, including in the Middle East and the West. Non-Somali fighters have occasionally orchestrated high-profile al-Shabaab attacks, notably the 2010 Kampala bombings and 2019 DusitD2 complex attack in Nairobi. However, of greater importance to al-Shabaab are the combat experience and specialised skills of some, usually Arab, foreign fighters, which have been linked to al-Shabaab's increased sophistication in producing explosives, improved sniper capability, and increased propensity to use suicide attacks. Foreign fighters may also have access to networks which improve al-Shabaab's capacity to recruit and operate in the region, and have made useful contributions to al-Shabaab's propaganda campaign: early Western recruits helped produce al-Shabaab's first English-language propaganda, and, thanks to its East African membership, Swahili remains the second most common language in al-Shabaab publications. Foreign fighters also have symbolic importance for al-Shabaab propaganda: al-Shabaab has intentionally played up the diversity of its recruits as a paean to its pan-Islamism – that is, to demonstrate that it transcends clannism and nationalism, embodying a united transnational ummah.

Early surge 
Foreign recruitment peaked in the period between 2011 and 2013, which was also the period in which the phenomenon received the most attention. The 2006 Ethiopian invasion of Somalia attracted foreign volunteers to al-Shabaab's cause, and, as of 2010, al-Shabaab included an estimated 200–300 foreign fighters, not including a further 1,000 ethnic Somalis from the diaspora. In subsequent years, al-Shabaab recruitment became a concern for the governments of both the United Kingdom and the United States. At a security conference in London in 2010, the former head of MI5, Jonathan Evans, said that "a significant number of U.K. residents" were training with al-Shabaab; the precise number of British recruits was estimated at between 50 and 100 persons. There was also evidence that the group had received funding from Somali residents in Britain. Between 2012 and 2013, several British citizens faced control orders or even criminal charges related to association with al-Shabaab.

Sweden, Denmark, Canada, and the U.S. similarly encountered evidence of citizens' affiliation with al-Shabaab. In the U.S., the U.S. Senate Homeland Security Committee heard as early as 2009 – from Michael Leiter, director of the National Counterterrorism Center – that American and other foreign fighters were being recruited and trained by al-Shabaab. In 2011, the House Committee on Homeland Security reported that more than 40 Muslim Americans and 20 Canadians had fought with al-Shabaab, and that at least 15 of those volunteers had been killed in Somalia. Later that year, a U.S. military official told the New York Times that about 30 U.S. citizens were al-Shabaab fighters. This was a resumption of an earlier trend of al-Shabaab recruitment among Americans, which previously had peaked in 2007–8. Also in 2011, two Somali Americans in Minnesota were convicted of illegally financing al-Shabaab. By mid-2013, observers believed that recruitment of U.S. citizens had subsided.

In general, foreign activity in al-Shabaab has decreased, first, and perhaps most importantly, because the Syrian civil war became the focal point for foreign jihadist recruitment networks. Other factors, however, are more specific to al-Shabaab. One factor was the group's internal struggle of 2011–13: as tensions between Somali and non-Somali members increased, Godane scapegoated the foreigners as the cause of the group's disunity and, during his 2013 purge, executed various foreign recruits . In addition to serving as a disincentive to foreign fighters, this shift reduced the influence of the group's remaining foreign leaders. Moreover, whereas the ascendancy of Godane and his faction had partly internationalized al-Shabaab, in subsequent years, al-Shabaab became (re-)"domesticated": as it made territorial gains, its attention was increasingly consumed by local governance and the management of clan dynamics, activities in which foreign fighters – frequently mistrusted by local populations – lacked utility and influence. As the conflict, and al-Shabaab's priorities, became more localized and clan-based, they also held less appeal for foreign fighters themselves. Foreign fighters also attracted the counterterrorism efforts of foreign countries, and were sometimes suspected of disloyalty and spying by their Somali peers.

Current status 
As of 2020, estimates of the number of foreign recruits still active in al-Shabaab ranged from 450 to 2,000. Most of those recruits are from East Africa – primarily Kenya, but also Tanzania and Uganda, all countries in which al-Shabaab recruitment networks are well entrenched. The flow of recruits from Arab countries and the West has diminished substantially since 2014, except for in the case of Yemen. Moreover, few foreign fighters hold strategically important roles in the group. Many are among the rank-and-file of the military wing. Those in leadership positions tend to have prominent, but strategically marginal or mid-level, roles – for example, in managing the group's public relations or external relations, or in supervising and training other foreign recruits. (Godane's nationalist critics, however, argue that earlier, under his leadership, foreign fighters did in fact gain significant influence over the group.) Since 2013, al-Shabaab has also established two external military units, on Godane's initiative: one, in Ethiopia, has struggled, but the other, in the Great Lakes region, has carried out several attacks in Kenya.

Relationship with other militant groups

Hizbul Islam 
Between 2010 and 2012, Hizbul Islam, a smaller group of Somali militants, was merged with al-Shabaab: after suffering military defeats against al-Shabaab in southern towns, Hizbul Islam was officially absorbed by its former rival in December 2010. However, on September 24, 2012, Hizbul Islam announced that it would split from al-Shabaab, claiming the union had only ever been nominal and that the factions' political philosophies had differed irreconcilably. Hizbul Islam said that it welcomed "negotiations with all groups for the interest of Somalia", and added that al-Shabaab had been considerably "weakened" in recent years.

Al-Qaeda 
Before 2012, al-Qaeda and al-Shabaab had what academic Daniel Byman calls an "on-again, off-again" relationship, though both groups praised each other online in 2008. During this early period, al-Shabaab occasionally harboured al-Qaeda leaders in Somalia, in exchange for their technical assistance. In September 2009, in a video entitled "At Your Service Osama", al-Shabaab publicly declared allegiance to al-Qaeda leader Osama bin Laden – but this reflected an "unrequited courtship", largely ignored by al-Qaeda. However, after bin Laden's death and replacement by Ayman al-Zawahiri, al-Shabaab became an official al-Qaeda affiliate in February 2012. In a fifteen-minute video message released on February 9, al-Shabaab leader Godane pledged allegiance to al-Qaeda and al-Zawahiri on behalf of al-Shabaab. Al-Zawahiri confirmed the alliance, which he said would "please the believers and disturb the disbelievers" and "support the jihadi unity against the Zio-Crusader campaign and their assistants amongst the treacherous agent rulers." The announcement was met with internal opposition among some factions of al-Shabaab .

By late 2012, the groups cooperated closely in various arenas, especially indoctrination and training, both in basic infantry skills and in advanced explosives and assassination – after the merger, a corps of al-Qaeda-trained militants moved to Somalia to train members of al-Shabaab. However, al-Shabaab remained "largely independent". Similarly, although al-Shabaab has publicly exploited the al-Qaeda "brand", echoing al-Qaeda ideology in its recruitment videos, it is unclear whether the alliance has affected al-Shabaab's behaviour and aims on the ground. A 2021 statistical analysis suggests that it has not significantly affected al-Shabaab's military strategy. While an al-Shabaab commander has claimed that the group will bring jihad first to East Africa "and afterward, with God's will, to America", an analyst at the Center for Strategic and International Studies argues that the group is far more interested in establishing a fundamentalist government inside Somalia than in carrying out attacks in the West.

AQAP, AQIM and Boko Haram
In June 2012, General Carter Ham of the U.S. Army said that al-Shabaab, al-Qaeda in Islamic Maghreb (AQIM), and the Nigeria-based Boko Haram were attempting to coordinate their activities, including in funding, training, and explosives. In 2011, Boko Haram's first suicide bomb attack had been preceded by a public statement warning that "our jihadists have arrived in Nigeria from Somalia where they received real training on warfare from our brethren who made that country ungovernable", which analysts understood as an allusion to cooperation with al-Shabaab. However, in the view of some observers, most consequential are al-Shabaab's links to al-Qaeda in the Arabian Peninsula (AQAP). AQAP is based in Yemen, which has longstanding ties to Somalia, and analyst Katherine Zimmerman told the U.S. Congress that AQAP "almost certainly provided the equipment or the expertise" for al-Shabaab's 2016 laptop bomb.

Islamic State
In early 2015, the Islamic State of Iraq and the Levant (ISIL) published online the first of a series of videos aimed at al-Shabaab, calling on the group to switch allegiances from al-Qaeda to ISIL and its leader Abu Bakr al-Baghdadi. These public appeals had reportedly been preceded by informal ISIL attempts to establish a relationship with al-Shabaab. Yet al-Shabaab publicly ignored the overtures. By September 2015, it had issued an internal memo, directed at pro-ISIL elements in its ranks, reaffirming the group's allegiance to al-Qaeda and banning any discussion about ISIL. The group also detained several fighters who had voiced support for ISIL.

In October 2015, senior al-Shabaab commander Abdul Qadir Mumin and approximately 20 of his followers in Puntland pledged allegiance to ISIL, establishing what became Islamic State in Somalia (ISIS). Further defections in al-Shabaab ranks occurred in the border region between Somalia and northern Kenya, leading the head of al-Shabaab in the Lower Shabelle region, Abu Abdalla, to announce that all pro-ISIL members should leave the group or be killed. The groups clashed violently on several occasions, most fiercely during 2015, and al-Shabaab's internal security service continued to arrest, and sometimes execute, suspected ISIS supporters within al-Shabaab's ranks.

Violent conflict between the groups was reinvigorated in 2018 by ISIS provocation, and, in December, al-Shabaab's spokesman announced an offensive – code-named Operation Disease Eradication – against ISIS. The same week, al-Shabaab's governor-general, Sheikh Mohamed Abubakar, released an 8-page treatise rebuking ISIS's ideology and listing crimes it had committed under the Quran.

Sources of income and arms
In 2020, the Hiraal Institute estimated that al-Shabaab collected at least $15 million in revenue every month, implying revenue on a similar scale to the government's; and the UN estimates that the group's military budget was approximately $21 million in 2019. In the period after 2014, al-Shabaab established its own Ministry of Finance, and it has cultivated various revenue streams, among which it switches as its military position or political circumstances change.

External support 
During its early years, al-Shabaab received substantial external support in donations from the Somali diaspora or interested international jihadists, enabled by the weakness of the Somalian government's financial regulation framework and the ubiquitous use of the hawala system for receipt of remittances. Although al-Shabaab initially appeared a promising alternative to the Islamic Courts Union, its popularity with diaspora donors declined after the Ethiopian withdrawal and as the group gained a reputation for brutality. Concurrently, however, al-Shabaab increased its ties to other jihadist groups, especially al-Qaeda, which have extensive capacity to generate income in the Arabian Peninsula and Horn of Africa. For example, years before al-Shabaab became an official al-Qaeda affiliate, bin Laden publicly called on Muslims to send money to al-Shabaab. However, over the past decade, the counterterrorism efforts of foreign governments have obstructed international funding sources.

According to authorities, the Somali state of Puntland is a key transit point for weapons shipments into Somalia from foreign countries – particularly frequent shipments of small arms and ammunition from Yemen, typically transported across the Gulf of Aden in skiffs, and occasionally larger shipments from the Makran coast of Iran. Puntland authorities have also seized Yemeni explosives shipments, which they suspect are the result of cooperation between al-Shabaab and Yemen-based AQAP.

Alleged Eritrean support 
In December 2009, adopting Resolution 1907, the UN Security Council imposed sanctions on Eritrea, accusing the country of arming and financing militia groups, including al-Shabaab, in southern Somalia's conflict zones.  Reports in 2010 and 2011 by a UN International Monitoring Group alleged continuing Eritrean support to Somali rebels – including, in the latter year, about $80,000 in monthly financial support and two air deliveries of weapons – but the Eritrean government emphatically denied the accusations, describing them as "concocted, baseless and unfounded". The International Crisis Group added some credence to Eritrea's denials, suggesting that historical Eritrean support to Somali miilitants had been aimed at undermining Ethiopia during its 2006–9 invasion, and that Hizbul Islam was more likely a recipient than al-Shabaab.

On July 5, 2012, the U.S. government imposed sanctions on Eritrea's intelligence chief and a high-ranking military officer, who allegedly facilitated support to al-Shabaab. However, later that year, the UN Monitoring Group on Somalia and Eritrea reported that it had found no evidence of direct Eritrean support to al-Shabaab in the preceding year. Between then and 2017, successive annual reports of the Monitoring Group found no evidence for Eritrean involvement, while noting that Eritrea had not provided full access to investigators; nonetheless, the UN Security Council did not enact the group's recommendation to lift its sanctions on Eritrea until November 2018.

Internal revenue

Trade and smuggling 
As al-Shabaab expanded its territorial control, it was able to augment its internal funding through illicit markets and local populations. The smuggling of charcoal has been an important source of income for the group since it first gained control of Somali port cities, especially Kismayo. Calculating that al-Shabaab was earning between $15 million and $50 million annually from illegal trade, the UN banned Somali charcoal imports. The group also profits from involvement in – or taxation of – the smuggling and sale of ivory, sugar, and, reportedly, heroin; and it has been implicated in illegal mining and minerals exports in East Africa. There is some evidence that al-Shabaab has profited from piracy. In 2011, the head of the UN's counter-piracy division, Colonel John Steed, warned that there was circumstantial evidence that al-Shabaab increasingly sought to cooperate with pirate gangs and other criminal organizations. Further reports suggested that Al-Shabaab members had extorted pirates, demanding protection money equivalent to 20% of the pirates' ransom proceeds, but did not provide evidence that al-Shabaab was itself involved in piracy.

Extortion and taxation 
Also in the 2008–11 period, al-Shabaab established a sophisticated taxation system, framed as a form of zakat, in line with sharia, but often resembling extortion. Al-Shabaab taxes may apply to clans, traders, corporations, farmers, or livestock herders – in fact, livestock are sometimes stolen outright by al-Shabaab militants, with the theft framed as a kind of pre-emptive in-kind taxation. Humanitarian aid agencies are also taxed or extorted, in exchange for permission to operate inside certain territories ; and al-Shabaab has been known to execute kidnappings for ransom. In recent years, facing territorial losses in urban areas, al-Shabaab has had less recourse to previous revenue streams – notably the charcoal trade, through Kismayo, and the remittance economy – and therefore has relied more heavily on extracting zakat. The development of its security and intelligence services has allowed it to expand its tax base by imposing taxes even in areas outside its territorial control: according to the Hiraal Institute, more than half of al-Shabaab's revenue in 2019–20 came from Mogadishu, whose major companies are taxed at 2.5% of their annual profits. Indeed, a commander in the Somali army confessed to paying tax to al-Shabaab despite being at war with it. The group has been known to punish non-payment severely, including by blockading villages under threat of starvation.

Somali government 
Either directly or indirectly through black markets, al-Shabaab has access to arms intended for the Somali government. In 2018 and 2019, expert reports to the UN Security Council found that government military equipment enters the black market, where some of it is sold to al-Shabaab militants. In some cases, senior government officials orchestrate large-scale diversions of government arms and ammunition; in others, low-ranking members of the security forces sell their weapons for subsistence. An earlier report in 2014 had alleged that government officials were actively involved in the direct supply of governments arms to al-Shabaab. The group has also been known to infiltrate government institutions, as became clear when regional government employees carried out al-Shabaab's 24 July 2019 Mogadishu bombing, which killed Mogadishu Mayor Abdirahmean Omar Osman.

International response

Terrorist designation 
The following countries have officially listed al-Shabaab as a terrorist organization:

  (since 22 August 2009)
  (since 5 March 2010)
 
  (since 10 February 2010)
  (since 18 March 2016)
  (since 15 November 2014)
  (since March 2010)
  (since 29 February 2008)

Bounties 
In 2012, with the support of the Somali government, the United States began issuing bounties for al-Shabaab members under its Rewards for Justice Program. On June 7, the U.S. Department of State offered a total of $33 million in bounties for information leading to the capture of any of seven senior commanders, including $7 million for Godane, then the group's emir, and $5 million for Robow, then his deputy. In response, al-Shabaab's Fu'ad Qalaf issued a mock bounty of his own, promising ten camels to anyone possessing information on U.S. President Barack Obama, and a further, less valuable, reward of ten cocks and ten hens for information on Hillary Clinton, the U.S. Secretary of State. On an official state visit to Mogadishu, top U.S. envoy Johnnie Carson dismissed the counter-offer as "absurd". He also announced that the U.S. would impose sanctions, including visa and travel bans and asset freezes, on anyone attempting to thwart the ongoing political transition in Somalia.

On March 21, 2013, the U.S. Department of State offered $5 million apiece for information on two American senior al-Shabaab commanders, Omar Shafik Hammami and Jehad Serwan Mostafa. On March 15, 2014, it issued three further bounties, including one on Abdukadir Mohamed Abdukadir, who it said coordinated al-Shabaab's recruitment activities in Kenya. On September 27, 2014, after Godane's death, the Somali National Intelligence and Security Agency announced its own bounty, offering $2 million for information leading to the arrest of the new emir, Umar, and a separate $1 million reward for information leading to his killing. Several further Somali bounties were issued on April 10, 2015, with rewards ranging between $100,000 and $250,000. In a separate programme, on April 3, 2015, the Kenyan government offered KSh. 20 million ($215,000) for information leading to the arrest of Mohamed Mohamud, a commander of al-Shabaab's operations in Kenya.

List of leaders

Emirs 

 Ahmad Umar Abu Ubaidah (2014–present)
 Ahmed Godane (2007–14)

Former members 
Former leading members of al-Shabaab include:

 Hassan Dahir Aweys
 Mohamed Said Atom
 Mukhtar Robow
 Mujahid Miski
 Abdul Qadir Mumin
 Aden Hashi Farah Ayro
 Ibrahim al-Afghani
 Hassan Abdullah Hersi al-Turki

Foreign leaders and members 
Prominent foreign al-Shabaab members have included:
 Jehad Serwan Mostafa (United States)
 Abu Musa Mombasa (Pakistan) 
 Fu'ad Qalaf Shongole (Sweden) 
 Samantha Lewthwaite (Britain) (unconfirmed)
 Fazul Abdullah Mohammed (Kenya)
 Abdukadir Mohamed Abdukadir (Kenya)
 Omar Shafik Hammami (United States)

See also

 Child soldiers in Somalia
 Drone strikes in Somalia
 Human rights in Somalia
 Islam in Somalia
 Religion in Somalia
 Freedom of religion in Somalia

Notes

References

Bibliography

Books

Articles

Reports

External links

 Al-Shabab, Counter Extremism Project profile
 Al-Shabaab: How Great a Threat?: Hearing Before the Committee on Foreign Affairs, House of Representatives, One Hundred Thirteenth Congress, First Session, October 3, 2013
 August 2010 letter from Osama bin Laden to Ahmed Godane

 
Anti-Zionist organizations
Antisemitism in Africa
Factions in the Somali Civil War
Groups affiliated with al-Qaeda
Islam and antisemitism
Islam-related controversies
Islamic terrorism in Somalia
Islamist groups
Organisations designated as terrorist by Australia
Organisations designated as terrorist by the United Kingdom
Organizations designated as terrorist by Canada
Organizations designated as terrorist by Malaysia
Organisations designated as terrorist by New Zealand
Organizations designated as terrorist by the United Arab Emirates
Organizations designated as terrorist by the United States
Organizations based in Africa designated as terrorist
Organizations based in Asia designated as terrorist
Organizations established in 2007
Qutbist organisations
Rebel groups in Kenya
Rebel groups in Somalia
Rebel groups in Ethiopia
Salafi Jihadist groups